Parma Heights is a city in Cuyahoga County, Ohio, United States and a western suburb of Cleveland. Parma Heights is surrounded on the north, east and south by the larger city of Parma. The cities of Brook Park and Middleburg Heights form most of the western border. The city's population is 20,718 as of the 2010 census.

History

"Greenbriar" (1806-1826)

In 1806, the area that was to become Parma and Parma Heights was originally surveyed by Abraham Tappan, a surveyor for the Connecticut Land Company, and was known as Township 6 - Range 13. This designation gave the town its first identity in the Western Reserve. Soon after, Township 6 - Range 13 was commonly referred to as "Greenbriar," supposedly for the rambling bush that grew there. Benajah Fay, his wife Ruth Wilcox Fay, and their ten children, arrivals from Lewis County, New York, were the first settlers in 1816. The area of Greenbriar that was to later become Parma Heights was first settled in 1817. It was around that time that Greenbriar, under a newly organized government seat under Brooklyn Township, began attending to its own governmental needs.

Parma Township (1826-1911)

Self-government started to gain in popularity by the time the new Greenbriar settlement contained twenty householders. However, prior to the establishment of the new township, the name Greenbriar was replaced by the name Parma. This was largely due to Dr. David Long who had recently returned from Italy and "impressed with the grandeur and beauty...was reminded of Parma, Italy and...persuaded the early townspeople that the territory deserved a better name than Greenbriar."

Thus, on March 7, 1826, a resolution was passed ordering the construction of the new township. It stated,

 "On the petition of sundry inhabitants for a new township to be organized and erected comprising No. 6 in the 13th Range. Ordered that said Township No. 6 in the 13th Range be set off and erected into a new Township by the name of Parma, to be bounded by the original lines of said Township."

On the same day, a public notice was issued to qualified electors by the County Commissioners. They met at the house of Samuel Freeman on April 3, 1826 to elect township officers according to the law. It was then that the first eleven officers were elected to lead the new government.

During this time, Parma Township remained largely agricultural. The first schoolhouse was a log structure built on the hill at the northern corner of what is now Parma Heights Cemetery. A memorial plate on a stone marks the spot. In 1827, the township was divided into road districts. The Broadview Road of today was then known as Town Line Road as well as Independence Road. Ridge Road was known then as Center Road as it cut through the center of town. York Road was then known as York Street as arrivals from the state of New York settled there. Pearl Road then had many names which included Medina Wooster Pike, Wooster Pike, the Cleveland Columbus Road, and the Brighton and Parma Plank Road.

A stone house, known as the Henninger House, was built in 1849, occupied by several generations of Henningers, and is still standing today. More than 160 years ago, this house rested on one of the highest points in Cuyahoga County which provided visibility for the entire northeastern part of Parma Township. This was also the same site that the Erie Indians, centuries before, also stood to read and send fire signals as well as pray to their spirits.

By 1850, the US census listed Parma Township's population at 1,329. However, the rising population of the township had slowed over the decades. The Civil War affected Parma much like it did other towns and villages in the nation. Three out of four homes sent father or sons, or sometimes both, to fight in the war. By 1910, the population of the township had increased to 1,631.

Village of Parma Heights (1911-1956)

In 1911, Parma Heights, due to the temperance mood of the day, separated itself from the Parma Township by a vote of 42 to 32 and was incorporated as a village comprising 4.13 square miles.

 "A main reason for establishing the village of Parma Heights was to get a town marshal...There is one saloon in the territory...some pretty rough crowds Sundays have disturbed the quiet of the neighborhood...wanted it closed on Sundays...To do this they wished a town marshal. They couldn't have a town marshal without becoming a village, so they became one."

By 1920, census records show that Parma Heights contained 310 residents.

City of Parma Heights (1956-Present)

In December 1956, Parma Heights was incorporated as a city, under the administration of Roy F. Cappallo, Mayor.

On November 26, 2014, an early-morning fire destroyed the office of Mayor Mike Byrne and resulted in severe damage to city hall. Investigators determined the fire was intentionally set using a Molotov cocktail.

Geography
Parma Heights is located at  (41.386051, -81.763459).

Demographics

Languages
88.5% spoke English, 1.4% Ukrainian, 1.3% Spanish, 1.3% Polish, 1.2% Romanian, 1.2% Italian, and 0.9% German and Hungarian.

2010 census
As of the 2010 United States Census, there were 20,718 people, 9,534 households, and 5,298 families residing in the city. The racial makeup of the city was 91.1% White, 2.8% African American, 0.2% Native American, 3.0% Asian, 1.0% from other races, and 1.8% from two or more races. Hispanic or Latino of any race were 3.8% of the population.

There were 9,534 households, of which 23.4% had children under the age of 18 living with them, 39.7% were married couples living together, 11.7% had a female householder with no husband present, 4.2% had a male householder with no wife present, and 44.4% were non-families. 39.1% of all households were made up of individuals, and 18.6% had someone living alone who was 65 years of age or older. The average household size was 2.15 and the average family size was 2.89.

The median age in the city was 43.2 years. 18.9% of residents were under the age of 18; 8.2% were between the ages of 18 and 24; 24.9% were from 25 to 44; 27.6% were from 45 to 64; and 20.5% were 65 years of age or older. The gender makeup of the city was 46.5% male and 53.5% female.

2000 census
As of the 2000 United States Census, there were 21,659 people, 9,823 households, and 5,825 families residing in the city. The population density was 5,158.6 people per square mile (1,991.1/km). There were 10,263 housing units at an average density of 2,444.4 per square mile (943.5/km). The racial makeup of the city was 94.76% White, 1.17% African American, 0.13% Native American, 2.33% Asian, 0.01% Pacific Islander, 0.45% from other races, and 1.15% from two or more races. Hispanic or Latino of any race were 1.62% of the population.

There were 9,823 households, out of which 22.6% had children under the age of 18 living with them, 46.0% were married couples living together, 9.9% had a female householder with no husband present, and 40.7% were non-families. 36.5% of all households were made up of individuals, and 20.2% had someone living alone who was 65 years of age or older. The average household size was 2.18 and the average family size was 2.86.

In the city the population was spread out, with 19.1% under the age of 18, 7.2% from 18 to 24, 27.5% from 25 to 44, 21.1% from 45 to 64, and 25.1% who were 65 years of age or older. The median age was 42 years. For every 100 females, there were 86.0 males. For every 100 females age 18 and over, there were 81.9 males.

The median income for a household in the city was $36,985, and the median income for a family was $48,641. Males had a median income of $39,034 versus $27,564 for females. The per capita income for the city was $20,522. About 5.4% of families and 7.6% of the population were below the poverty line, including 10.7% of those under age 18 and 7.0% of those age 65 or over.

Government
There are seven council members serving at large. Every two years there is an election. Four positions are open. The top three candidates are each elected for a four-year term. The fourth candidate is awarded a two-year term.

The current mayor of Parma Heights is former city council member Marie Gallo, who beat fellow council member Anthony Stavole in a landslide election in November of 2021. Gallo was sworn into office on January 1, 2022..

Education

Colleges 
 Cuyahoga Community College (Western Campus), in the former Crile Hospital. Portions of the campus are within the Parma Heights border, although its address is based in Parma, Ohio.

Public Schools 
All three schools within the Parma City School District, there are no Middle Schools within Parma Heights' borders.

 Valley Forge High School, serving 8th-12th graders. (Mascot: Patriots)
 Parma Park Elementary School, serving K-4th graders. (Mascot: Eagles)

Private Schools 
 Holy Name High School, a Catholic co-educational high school belonging to the Roman Catholic Diocese of Cleveland. (Mascot: Green Wave)
 Holy Family School
 Incarnate Word Academy
 Parma Heights Christian Academy
 Parma Park Christian Life Academy

References

External links

 City website

Cities in Ohio
Cities in Cuyahoga County, Ohio
Italian-American culture in Ohio
Populated places established in 1818
Cleveland metropolitan area